The 1955 Kilkenny Senior Hurling Championship was the 61st staging of the Kilkenny Senior Hurling Championship since its establishment by the Kilkenny County Board.

On 6 November 1955, Bennettsbridge won the championship after a 6-06 to 1-04 defeat of Mooncoin in the final. It was their fourth championship title overall and their first title in two championship seasons.

Results

Final

References

Kilkenny Senior Hurling Championship
Kilkenny Senior Hurling Championship